John I of Ponthieu (d. July 11, 1302, Kortrijk, County of Flanders, Kingdom of France) was Count of Aumale.

He was son of Ferdinand II, Count of Aumale, and Laura of Montfort.

After the death of his father in 1260, he became co-ruler in the County of Aumale with his grandmother Joan. They reigned together until her death in 1279.

John married Ida of Meulan, and had a son John II (1293–1343), who succeeded him.

John fought as a knight in the French army against the Flemish in the Battle of the Golden Spurs on July 11, 1302 near Kortrijk, and was one of the many nobles killed in the battle.

Notes

References

Sources

1302 deaths
Counts of Aumale
French military personnel killed in action
Year of birth unknown